Miss Lebanon is the national beauty pageant in Lebanon. The current Miss Lebanon is Yasmina Zaytoun who was crowned on 24 July 2022.

History
Miss Lebanon has been broadcast on Lebanese Broadcasting Corporation (LBC) since 1975 and still till our days now, its winner will be sent to Miss Universe. It is currently organised by Miss Lebanon committee " Mr Antoine Maksoud ". The pageant has been cancelled a few times due to civil wars, conflicts with Israel and lack of protection for the delegates. The official winner represents Lebanon at the Miss Universe and Miss World pageants. Miss Lebanon Organization awards its winner prizes totalling over $400,000.

Format

Every year, the Miss Lebanon pageant takes on a new format with a new number of contestants. The pageant has taken the form of a one night gala, several primes, and even reality television. Below is an outline of the recent years of the pageant's format:

International crowns
 One – Miss Universe winner: Georgina Rizk (1971)
 One – Miss International winner: Christina Sawaya (2002)

Titleholders
The winner of Miss Lebanon represents her country at the Miss Universe and Miss World pageants. On occasion, when the winner does not qualify (due to age) for either contest, a runner-up is sent. Previously, in some instances the winner has also competed at the Miss International pageant.

Titleholders under Miss Lebanon org.
The Miss Lebanon winner competes at the Miss World and Miss Universe pageants. On occasion, a runner-up is sent. Here International pageants under Miss Lebanon Organization; Miss Lebanon and Miss Lebanon Emigrant who will go to Miss International pageant.

The following women represented Lebanon in the Big Four international beauty pageants, the four major international beauty pageants for women. These are Miss World, Miss Universe and Miss International

Miss Universe Lebanon

Miss World Lebanon

Miss Lebanon Emigrant

Started in 2007 the main winner of Miss Lebanon Emigrant under LBC goes to Miss International competition.

Miss International Lebanon 1960-2004

The Miss Lebanon has started to send a delegate to Miss International from 1960.

See also 
 Mister Lebanon
 Lebanon at major beauty pageants

References

External links 
 Sally Greige is Miss Lebanon 2014
 Miss Lebanon and Mister Lebanon
 Miss Lebanon 2007 (English and Arabic official site)
 Miss Lebanon 2010 Rahaf Abdalla

 

 
Beauty pageants in Lebanon
Lebanese awards
Lebanon
Lebanon
Lebanon